is a Japanese four-panel manga series by Harikamo, serialized in Houbunsha's seinen manga magazine Manga Time Kirara Miracle! since 2014. It has been collected in seven tankōbon volumes. An anime television series by J.C. Staff aired in Japan between January and March 2017.

Plot

Meirocho is a town filled with fortune tellers known as Uraras, who each specialize in different forms of fortune telling. Chiya, a girl who was raised in the woods, comes to Meirocho seeking the whereabouts of her mother. Joined by three other Urara trainees, Koume, Kon, and Nono, Chiya aims to become the highest ranked Urara in order to enlist the help of the legendary Urara and find her mother.

Characters

A girl who sometimes appears to have animal-like ears and a tail. She was raised in the woods by her mother's friend, Setsu. Having grown up alongside animals, she is quite agile and has a habit of exposing her stomach when apologising. She wishes to become an Urara to find her mother.

A straight-laced girl who specializes in kokkuri fortune telling. Due to the way she wears her ribbon, she is often thought to be a fox girl.

An energetic girl who dresses like a witch and specializes in tarot fortune telling.

A shy girl who is the younger sister of the Natsumeya's owner, Nina. She owns a doll named Matsuko given to her by her mother, who died when she was little, and often does ventriloquism with it. 

Nono's older sister, a Rank 5 Urara who runs the Natsumeya teahouse and tutors the other Uraras.

Captain of Meirocho's Bloque 10 Patrol Unit who is close friends with Nina. She is strict in her duties and often embarrassed by Chiya's shameless actions.
 

Patrol officers working under Saku, whom they both have secret crushes on.

A friend of Chiya's mother who raised Chiya in the forest after her mother's disappearance.
Narration

Media

Manga
The manga began serialization in Houbunsha's Manga Time Kirara Miracle! magazine in 2014. It has been compiled into seven tankōbon volumes as of July 25, 2019.

Anime
An anime television series adaptation by J.C.Staff aired in Japan between January 5, 2017, and March 23, 2017. The series is licensed in North America by Sentai Filmworks and streamed by Anime Network.

Episode list

Video game
Characters from the series appear alongside other Manga Time Kirara characters in the 2017 mobile RPG, Kirara Fantasia.

Note

References

External links
  
 
 

2017 anime television series debuts
Anime series based on manga
Houbunsha manga
J.C.Staff
Yonkoma
Seinen manga
Sentai Filmworks